This article provides a list of definitions of the term pogrom. The term originated as a loanword from the Russian verb громи́ть, meaning "to destroy, to wreak havoc, to demolish violently". The events in Odessa during Holy Week in 1871 were the first to be widely called a "pogrom" in Russian, and the events of 1881–82 introduced the term into common usage throughout the world.

Numerous definitions of the term have been proposed by scholars and dictionary publishers, but use of the term is inconsistent. Research into pogroms frequently requires consideration of the precise meaning of the word. Werner Bergmann writes that "there is as yet no consensus on terminology here among researchers", that "there has as yet been little interlinked research into pogroms" and that pogrom research has not yet focused on "distinguishing pogroms from other, closely related forms of ethnic violence". A number of other scholars, such as John Klier, Henry Abramson, David Engel, Paul R. Brass and Neal Pease, have discussed the consistency of the application of the term and the implications of its usage.

The term is sometimes used as "a generic term in English for all forms of collective violence directed against Jews"; however, usage of the word in this wider sense has been disputed.

List of definitions
According to the Oxford English Dictionary (OED), the word pogrom entered English from Yiddish which borrowed it from Russian. The OED gives two meanings for the word:

and

The first recorded use in English by the OED of the first meaning is in 1891 as a borrowed word, and it had become fully Anglicised by 1921. The OED records the first use of the second meaning as 1906 and that it had become fully Anglicised by 1975.

Other definitions

A general dictionary definition may be the one used by academics and other authorities when they describe an incident as a pogrom, or they may either select to use a different definition from a named source, or define the word themselves, to give it a specific meaning:

Characteristics
Historian David Engel writes that "there can be no logically or empirically compelling grounds for declaring that some particular episode does or does not merit the label [pogrom]," but he offers that the majority of the incidents "habitually" described as pogroms have some shared characteristics. Characteristics frequently noted by scholars to be shared by events which have been labelled as pogroms, include:
 "Organized Riot":  In his review of scholarly work on the topic, Bergmann writes that "there is agreement to the extent that pogroms are defined as a specific form of riot", although when discussion exactly how a pogrom is differentiated from other forms of riot he states "there is no consensus on terminology here among researchers." Comparing riots and pogroms, Paul R Brass writes: "The first carries the appearance of spontaneous, intergroup mass action, the second of deliberately organized—and especially—state-supported killings and the destruction of property of a targeted group. In fact, however, no hard and fast distinction can be made between these supposedly distinct forms of violence, since pogroms masquerade as riots and many, if not most, large-scale riots display features supposedly special to pogroms" The organization may or may not be as a result of government involvement. Russian pogroms were originally widely thought to have been officially sponsored, but according to Aleksei Miller, "participation of the authorities in setting up pogroms (even the one in Kishinev) can now be safely relegated to the realm of myth." Usage of the word has retained overtones of government involvement, although "the low level of organization separates [pogroms] from vigiliantism, terrorism, massacre, and genocide"
 "Persecution of a minority group": All definitions of the term suggest that victims are a "minority group" within a demographic, although this may be referred to as "ethnic", "racial", "cultural", "religious" or "national". Encyclopedia Britannica states that the victims of a pogrom are "persons and property of a specific religious, racial, or national minority". The victims are nationals or citizens of the same group as the attackers and as a minority group, there is an "imbalance of power" against the majority population. Engel writes that pogroms "took place in divided societies in which ethnicity or religion (or both) served as significant definers of both social boundaries and social rank... [and the] perpetrators expressed some complaint about the victims’ group, claiming collective injury or violation of one or more of their own group's cardinal values or legitimate prerogatives" According to Bergmann's review, "by the collective attribution of a threat, the pogrom differs from forms of violence, such as lynching, which are directed against individual members of a minority, while the imbalance of power in favor of the rioters distinguishes pogroms from other forms of riot". 
 "Massacres": Pogroms are commonly, but not always, defined to include massacres or murders. Bergmann writes that "researchers frequently fail to distinguish between pogrom and massacre" and "the differences lie in the fact that massacres are conducted by more highly organized and better armed assailants (often military or police units)... whereas the elements typical to a pogrom [are] a large group of attackers acting on a short-term basis within a local framework, and the destruction and looting of property"

Related terminology
Usage of the word pogrom overlaps with other terminology used to describe collective violence. Partial synonyms include:
 Ethnic riot: An ethnic riot is a riot focused on the persecution of an ethnic group. Donald L. Horowitz wrote in 2001 that "the pogrom is not so much a complementary species of interethnic violence as it is a subcategory of the ethnic riot". Prior to his death in 2007, scholar John Klier began preparing an article entitled "Were the Russian Pogroms a 'Deadly Ethnic RIot'?", referring to the term developed by Horowitz. In their 2002 book Exclusionary Violence: Antisemitic Riots in Modern German History, Christhard Hoffmann and Werner Bergmann use the term exclusionary ethnic riot or exclusionary riot as a synonym for pogrom.
 Genocidal massacre: A genocidal massacre is the killing of a local group within an ethnic minority, described by Leo Kuper as "the annihilation of a section of a group — men, women and children, as for example in wiping out of whole villages". George Andreopoulos wrote that "With [the] category [of genocidal massacres] we are now equipped to describe many pogroms, mass executions, and mass murders", referring to the term originally proposed by Kuper in 1982. William Schabas wrote that "Examples [of genocidal massacres] would be pogroms and mass executions. In a discussion of Balkan Genocides, Paul Mojzes wrote that "A more accurate meaning of pogrom is genocidal massacre", although Mojzes' definition of genocidal massacre is different to that of the other scholars mentioned.

Scholarly commentary on usage

John Klier writes that in relation to a list of 13 events "characterized as "pogroms" by historians", "virtually the only common feature of these events was that Jews were among the victims, although they were not always the primary target" The YIVO Encyclopedia states that "The common usage of the term pogrom to describe any attack against Jews throughout history disguises the great variation in the scale, nature, motivation, and intent of such violence at different times" Klier writes that the term is now "a generic term in English for all forms of collective violence directed against Jews"

In the introduction to Anti-Jewish Violence: Rethinking the Pogrom in East European History, the authors call the term a "somewhat reductionist rubric" in a discussion of the benefits of its usage. In Ideology, Politics, and Diplomacy in East Central Europe, Neal Pease writes that "the Morgenthau report consciously strove to limit usage of the word "pogrom" as an elastic and imprecise term applied indiscriminately to a broad range of actions".

Alekseĭ I. Miller writes that "The diversity of phenomena hiding behind the word pogrom is one of the symptoms of the ideological engagement of historiography" and, referring to Zygmunt Bauman's comment on "anti-semitism" noted that "using the same name to denote phenomena separated by centuries hides as much as reveals... is true of the term “pogrom.”"

Engel wrote that events "habitually tagged pogroms" include many "disparate occurrences" ranging from an event which "caused no Jewish casualties and did minimal damage to property" to events in which thousands of Jews were massacred. Klier writes that events which have been "characterized as "pogroms"" include events such as one in which "Jews were neither the initial nor the principal targets" and another "amidst a complete breakdown of public order [in which the] widespread atrocities carried out by all combatants fell upon many different segments of the population".

Aleksei Miller writes that "We are more prepared to answer the question of what pogroms were not than the question or what a pogrom was," and John Klier writes that "To determine what pogroms were, it is essential to consider what they were not."

Rogers Brubaker writes that "Violence—and more generally, conflict—regularly occasions social struggles to label, interpret, and explain it", which Donald L. Horowitz calls "conflict over the nature of the conflict". Specifically, Brubaker writes that "To impose a label or prevailing interpretive frame—to cause an event to be seen as a "pogrom" or a "riot" or a "rebellion"—is no mere matter of external interpretation, but a constitutive and often consequential act of social definition".

In his work entitled "On the Study of Riots, Pogroms, and Genocide", University of Washington Professor Paul R Brass writes that once a scholar states whether in their view an event is "better labeled a pogrom than a riot, a massacre of innocents rather than a fair fight between groups, a genocide rather than a “mere” pogrom", scholars then "unavoidably, necessarily, become embroiled within and take a position upon the events we study." Brass writes that "The study of the various forms of mass collective violence has been blighted by methodological deficiencies and ideological premises... Our work then becomes entangled—even through the very theories we articulate—in the diversionary tactics that are essential to the production and reproduction of violence. The diversionary process begins with the issue of labelling, which itself is part of the process of production and reproduction of violence, and the post-hoc search for causes"

In "The Color of Words: An Encyclopaedic Dictionary of Ethnic Bias in the United States", Philip Herbst writes that the word "pogrom has been used loosely and, according to some, misused in an inflammatory way." John Klier writes that "when applied indiscriminately to events in Eastern Europe, the term can be misleading, the more so when it implies that "pogroms" were regular events in the region and that they always shared common features." In an interview with Bob Costas, Elie Wiesel suggested that he was bothered when the term was "misused and trivialized".

See also
 Definitions of genocide
 Definitions of fascism 
 Definitions of terrorism 
 List of events named pogrom
 Holocaust trivialization
 Euphemism treadmill
 Semantic change

Notes

References

 
 
 
 
 
 
 
 
 
 
 
 
 
 
 
 
 
 
 
 
 
 

 
pogrom